Huxiang Expressway, designated S6 and originally known as A17 Expressway, is an expressway in Shanghai, China.

References

Expressways in Shanghai